Bu Quwah (Arabic: بو قوة , sometimes transliterated as Buquwa or Abu Quwah) is a small village situated in north-central Bahrain.

Administration

It lies in constituency one of the Northern Governorate administrative region of the country. The most recent election in the constituency took place in the 2011 parliamentary by-election, with independent Ali Hassan Ali winning a seat in the lower house of Bahraini parliament.

Infrastructure

In 2009, plans to construct a park in the village were announced as part of a greater beautification project by the governorate. A 37,803 sq mile housing project was launched in 2010. A power plant was said to be constructed.

References

Populated places in the Northern Governorate, Bahrain